Senator Keith may refer to:

Hastings Keith (1915–2005), Massachusetts State Senate
Lucien Keith (1860–1933), Virginia State Senate
Sandy Keith (1928–2020), Minnesota State Senate
Ziba Cary Keith (1842–1909), Massachusetts State Senate